Phillips County is a county located in the U.S. state of Colorado. As of the 2020 census, the population was 4,530. The county seat is Holyoke. The county was named in honor of R.O. Phillips, a secretary of the Lincoln Land Company, who organized several towns in Colorado.

Geography

Adjacent counties
Sedgwick County—north
Perkins County, Nebraska—northeast
Chase County, Nebraska—east
Yuma County—south
Logan County—west

Major Highways
  U.S. Highway 6
  U.S. Highway 385
  State Highway 23
  State Highway 59

Demographics

At the 2000 census there were 4,480 people, 1,781 households, and 1,239 families living in the county.  The population density was 6 people per square mile (3/km2).  There were 2,014 housing units at an average density of 3 per square mile (1/km2).  The racial makeup of the county was 93.04% White, 0.20% Black or African American, 0.29% Native American, 0.40% Asian, 0.02% Pacific Islander, 4.71% from other races, and 1.34% from two or more races.  11.76% of the population were Hispanic or Latino of any race.
Of the 1,781 households 32.90% had children under the age of 18 living with them, 61.20% were married couples living together, 5.60% had a female householder with no husband present, and 30.40% were non-families. Of all households 27.50% were one person and 14.30% were one person aged 65 or older.  The average household size was 2.47 and the average family size was 3.01.

The age distribution was 26.90% under the age of 18, 6.30% from 18 to 24, 25.30% from 25 to 44, 22.20% from 45 to 64, and 19.40% 65 or older.  The median age was 40 years. For every 100 females there were 93.40 males.  For every 100 females age 18 and over, there were 90.50 males.

The median household income was $32,177 and the median family income  was $38,144. Males had a median income of $30,095 versus $18,682 for females. The per capita income for the county was $16,394.  About 8.80% of families and 11.60% of the population were below the poverty line, including 14.70% of those under age 18 and 7.20% of those age 65 or over.

Politics

Like all the High Plains, Phillips County is overwhelmingly Republican. It has not been carried by a Democratic presidential nominee since Jimmy Carter in 1976, and Michael Dukakis in 1988 during a major drought has been the only Democrat since to receive over one-third of the county's ballots.

Communities

City
Holyoke

Towns
Haxtun
Paoli

Census-designated place
Amherst

See also

 Outline of Colorado
 Index of Colorado-related articles
 National Register of Historic Places listings in Phillips County, Colorado

Notes

References

External links

Phillips County Economic Development Corporation website
Colorado County Evolution by Don Stanwyck
Colorado Historical Society

 

 
1889 establishments in Colorado
Colorado counties
Eastern Plains
Populated places established in 1889